Andritany Ardhiyasa (born 26 December 1991) is an Indonesian professional footballer who plays as a goalkeeper for and captains Liga 1 club Persija Jakarta. His older brother, Indra Kahfi is also a football player, plays in Bhayangkara FC.

Club career
In 2007, Andritany started his senior career with Pesik Kuningan.

In March 2009, he joined Sriwijaya FC as an emergency goalkeeper after all three of Sriwijaya's goalkeepers went out with injuries. He made his debut in January 2010 when Sriwijaya drew 1-1 with Persik Kediri.

Career statistics

Club

International

National team appearances

Honours

Club
Persib U-18
Soeratin Cup: 2006

Sriwijaya
Piala Indonesia: 2008-09, 2010

Persija Jakarta
 Liga 1: 2018
 Indonesia President's Cup: 2018
Menpora Cup: 2021

International
Indonesia U-23
Southeast Asian Games  Silver medal: 2011, 2013
Islamic Solidarity Games  Silver medal: 2013
2018 PSSI Anniversary Cup Third Place
Indonesia
AFF Championship runner-up: 2016
 Aceh World Solidarity Cup runner-up: 2017

Individual
Liga 1 Best Eleven: 2017, 2018
 Menpora Cup Best Eleven: 2021

References

External links 
 
 

1991 births
Living people
Betawi people
Sportspeople from Jakarta
Indonesian footballers
Indonesia international footballers
Footballers at the 2014 Asian Games
Indonesia youth international footballers
Association football goalkeepers
Persija Jakarta players
Sriwijaya F.C. players
Liga 1 (Indonesia) players
Southeast Asian Games silver medalists for Indonesia
Southeast Asian Games medalists in football
Footballers at the 2018 Asian Games
Competitors at the 2011 Southeast Asian Games
Competitors at the 2013 Southeast Asian Games
Asian Games competitors for Indonesia